Gospel Church is a Protestant church in the county-level city of Jiangyou, Mianyang, Sichuan Province. Founded in 1894, it was originally an Anglican church in the Szechwan Diocese of the Church in China.

History 

They established churches and mission stations across western Sichuan, Chungpa Church was the first church building in the province founded by the CMS.

After the communist takeover of China in 1949, Christian Churches in China were forced to sever their ties with respective overseas Churches, which has thus led to the merging of Gospel Church into the communist-established Three-Self Patriotic Church.

During the 2008 Sichuan earthquake, the church was damaged beyond repair. A new Gospel Church was built at the junction of Fujiang Road and Qingxin Alley, completed in an entirely neo-Gothic style.

See also 
 Anglicanism in Sichuan
 Gospel Church, Guanghan
 Gospel Church, Kangding
 Gospel Church, Mianyang
 Gospel Church, Mianzhu
 Gospel Church, Wanzhou
 St John's Church, Chengdu

References 

19th-century Anglican church buildings
19th-century churches in China
Churches completed in the 1890s
Churches completed in the 2010s
Churches in Mianyang
Jiangyou
Protestant churches in China
Rebuilt churches
Jiangyou
Jiangyou